Faithfully may refer to:

 Faithfully (Faith Evans album), 2001
 Faithfully (Johnny Mathis album), 1959
 Faithfully (Jovit Baldivino album), 2010
 "Faithfully" (song), a song by Journey
 Faithfully (TV series), a 2012 Philippine drama series
 "Faithfully" (Law & Order: Criminal Intent), an episode of Law & Order: Criminal Intent

See also 
 Faithful (disambiguation)